is a Japanese figure skater. He is the 2022 Egna Trophy Junior champion, the 2022 Junior Grand Prix Poland II champion, the 2022 Junior Grand Prix Italy bronze medalist, the 2022 Japanese Junior national silver medalist, and 2022 Junior Grand Prix Final qualifier.

Personal life
Kataise was born on February 8, 2004, in Shimane, Japan. He enjoys travelling and watching movies. He graduated from Kansai University Senior High School, and he attends Kansai University as of 2022, studying law.

He decided to include his middle name in competition beginning from the 2022–23 figure skating season, he spoke on this saying: "My name on the family register is Takeru Amine Kataise, my original name has a middle name. I wanted a fresh start." Prior to this, he competed as Takeru Kataise.

Career

Early years
Kataise began skating in 2011. He made his international debut at the 2017 Coupe du Printemps, winning in the Novice category. He placed second at the 2017 Japan Novice A Championships, behind Shun Sato.

2021–22 season
Kataise began the season competing in the Kinki Regional Championships. He placed 3rd in the short program, but fell to 5th in the free skate, placing 4th overall, qualifying for the Western Sectional Championship, where he placed 2nd in both the short program and free skate, and placed 2nd overall, behind Tatsuya Tsuboi. He qualified to compete at the 2021–22 Japan Junior Championships, where he placed 3rd after the short program despite a fall on his triple Axel, however he later popped his opening triple Axel in his free skate into a single, and lost points in the grade of execution on multiple jumps, placing 4th overall in the competition.

He was selected to compete at the 2021–22 Japan Senior Championships for the first time. In the short program, he fell on his triple Lutz, which was intended to be part of a combination, and added a double toe loop to his triple flip later in the program instead. In the free skate, he popped his opening triple Axel into a double Axel, which received a downgrade, he also made the same mistake on his final triple Salchow. He placed 14th overall, with a score of 199.65. Kataise was sent to compete at the 2022 Egna Trophy, making his international junior debut. He scored 82.94 in the short program, breaking the 80 point barrier for the first time, and received level fours on all of his spins and his step sequence. He fell on his opening triple Axel in the free skate, however came back with a triple Axel-triple toe loop combination, scoring 143.20, and 226.14 overall, breaking the 210 and 220 barriers for the first time in his career.

2022–23 season
Kataise was assigned to compete at the 2022 Junior Grand Prix Armenian Cup, and the 2022 Junior Grand Prix Egna/Neumarkt. However, after the cancellation of the Armenia Cup due to the Armenia-Azerbaijan crisis, he was reassigned to compete at the second stage of the Junior Grand Prix in Poland instead.

He made his ISU Junior Grand Prix debut at the 2022 ISU Baltic Cup in Poland. He placed first in the short program with a score of 79.06, receiving multiple fours and a five from a Swiss judge in grade of execution on his opening triple Axel. He later went on to win the free skate, with two triple Axels, including one in combination with a triple toe loop, and receiving all level fours on his spins, his only mistake being a two-footed landing on his double Axel-triple toe loop combination. He achieved a personal best score of 155.18 in the free skate, and 234.24 overall, breaking the 230 barrier for the first time and winning the competition by over ten points.

He then competed at his second Junior Grand Prix, Egna/Neumarkt in Italy. He had an unsuccessful short program, falling on his opening triple Axel, then turning an intended triple loop into a double, which also resulted in a fall, placing 7th. However, he was able to rise back to podium position after placing 3rd in the free skate, taking the bronze medal behind Lucas Broussard, and teammate . His placements of first and third on the Junior Grand Prix circuit, meant he qualified for the ISU Junior Grand Prix Final in Torino.

Kataise competed at the Japan Western Sectional competition, where he placed second after the short program, falling to forth in the free skate, and placing forth overall. He then competed at the 2022–23 Japan Junior Championships, where he achieved a new national junior record in the short program of 83.27. He had an unsuccessful free skate, in which he placed 6th, however his almost twelve point lead from the short program placed him second overall, taking his first national junior medal.

Kataise competed at the 2022–23 Junior Grand Prix Final, coming into the competition with the highest free skating and highest total score received on the Junior Grand Prix circuit that season. He fell on his opening triple Axel in the short program, hitting the boards, then fell a second time on his triple Lutz, being unable to complete the mandatory jump combination for the short program, placing him 6th. In the free skate, he was able to land both of his triple Axels, however multiple mistakes later in the program lead him to place 5th in the free skate and 6th overall, with a total score of 182.49.

Kataise was invited to compete at the 2022–23 Japan Senior Championships. He stepped out of his triple Axel in the short program, and was only able to add a double toe loop to his triple Lutz later on in the program, placing 14th with a score of 70.05. He fell to 21st in the free skate, and placed 19th overall. He was also invited to perform at the Medalists On Ice exhibition.

Programs

Competitive highlights 
JGP: Junior Grand Prix

2017-18 to Present

2013-14 to 2016-17

Detailed results 
Current personal best scores are highlighted in bold.

Junior level

References

External links

2004 births
Living people
Japanese male single skaters
Sportspeople from Hyōgo Prefecture